Mucilaginibacter defluvii is a Gram-negative, rod-shaped, aerobic and non-motile bacterium from the genus of Mucilaginibacter which has been isolated from a dye wastewater treatment facility in Korea.

References

Sphingobacteriia
Bacteria described in 2014